City of Anderson Transit System (CATS)  is the local bus service for Anderson, Indiana.  CATS has 7 routes. Fares are $1.00, except for the those above 60 or disabled veterans, whose fare is 50 cents. Nifty Lift, the Demand Response, has a fare of $2.00. Current hours are Monday to Friday 8–4.

Routes

References

Bus transportation in Indiana
Anderson, Indiana
Transportation in Madison County, Indiana
Transit agencies in Indiana